Brian Bailey (20 August 1932–16 July 2022) was a British sports shooter.

Shooting career
He competed in the trap event at the 1972 Summer Olympics. He represented England and won a silver medal in the clay pigeon trap, at the 1974 British Commonwealth Games in Christchurch, New Zealand.

References

External links

1932 births
2022 deaths
British male sport shooters
Olympic shooters of Great Britain
Shooters at the 1972 Summer Olympics
Sportspeople from Shropshire
Shooters at the 1974 British Commonwealth Games
Commonwealth Games medallists in shooting
Commonwealth Games silver medallists for England
20th-century British people
Medallists at the 1974 British Commonwealth Games